Aglossosia flavimarginata is a moth of the  subfamily Arctiinae. It is found in Kenya, South Africa and Uganda.

References

Moths described in 1900
Lithosiini
Moths of Africa
Insects of Uganda